Victor Amobi (born 3 July 1990) is a Nigerian professional footballer who plays as a winger for Forward Club in India.

Career
From Nigeria, Amobi moved to Nepal and has played for sides such as Three Star Club, friends Club, African United Club, and Three Star Club.

Minerva Punjab
In December 2016, it was announced that Amobi signed with Minerva Punjab of the I-League in India. He made his debut for the club on 8 January 2017 in their opening league match of the season against Chennai City. He started and played the whole match as Minerva Punjab drew 0–0.

Career statistics

References

External links 
 Victor Amobi at Eurosport

1990 births
Living people
Nigerian footballers
Nigerian expatriate footballers
Three Star Club players
RoundGlass Punjab FC players
Manang Marshyangdi Club players
Association football forwards
I-League players
Expatriate footballers in India
Nigerian expatriate sportspeople in India
Expatriate footballers in Nepal
Nigerian expatriate sportspeople in Nepal